The flag of Boston consists of a sky blue field and the seal of the city of Boston, Massachusetts, United States, in the center. The flag is sometimes flown in a darker shade of blue, more of a turquoise. It was designed in 1913 and adopted by the Boston City Council on January 29, 1917.

History

The city flag was originally used in the 1913 Columbus Day celebration and other holidays in an unofficial capacity for three years until it was officially adopted by the city government on January 29, 1917. It uses the city seal, which was designed in 1823 and officially adopted in 1914. The motto contained within the seal are the Latin words , meaning "God be with us as he was with our fathers".

The flag placed 133rd out of 150 city flags in a 2004 survey by the North American Vexillological Association, based on appearance. It is commonly categorized by vexillologists as a "seal on a bed sheet".

Use

The city's website describes the shade used on the field as "Continental blue". The proportions of the flag are 7:10. The code specifies that the flag is to be flown at Boston City Hall and at Boston Common. It is also flown at private locations within and around the city. When used, the flag is supposed to have a gold fringe. However, it can be inferred that this is only for indoor use of the flag.

Municipal Standard
Boston's city ordinance to make a city flag also made a "municipal standard". This flag's obverse is the same as the city flag, besides the addition of a buff stripe on three sides. The reverse of this flag has a seal displaying the "trimountain", the original three hills Boston was built on.

References

Flags of cities in Massachusetts
Flag
Flag
1917 establishments in Massachusetts
Flags introduced in 1917